Jytte Andersen (born 9 September 1942) is a Danish politician.

She was born in Copenhagen to Boye Johansen and Inga Johansen. She was elected member of Folketinget for the Social Democrats from 1979 to 2007. She was appointed Minister for Labour in Poul Nyrup Rasmussen's first, second, and third cabinets, from 25 January 1993 to 23 March 1998. She was also a member of Rasmussen's fourth cabinet, as Minister for Towns and Homes and Minister for Gender Equality.

References

1942 births
Living people
People from Copenhagen
Government ministers of Denmark
Social Democrats (Denmark) politicians
20th-century Danish politicians
20th-century Danish women politicians
21st-century Danish politicians
21st-century Danish women politicians
Women government ministers of Denmark